Sidi M'hamed Bou Qobrine Cemetery is a cemetery in the commune of Belouizdad in Algeria. The name relates to Sidi M'hamed Bou Qobrine.

History
In the place of this Muslim cemetery, in 1830 during the French conquest of Algeria, there was only the mausoleum of Sidi M'hamed Bou Qobrine and a few graves among the wild olive trees.

It was then that the burials of the Muslim dead in Algiers were more and more numerous in the El Kettar cemetery from 1834, and in the Sidi M'hamed Cemetery.

The latter began to be a Muslim necropolis only around 1850, when the cemeteries occupying the site of the streets of Tripoli, Larbi Ben Mhidi, Ali Boumendjel and Boulevard Debbih Cherif were destroyed.

Originally surrounded by cacti and aloe vera, a perimeter wall was built to surrounded it at the start of the 20th century.

The entrance gate, the minaret, the portico and the fountain were also built at this time.

Notable interments

Sidi M'hamed Bou Qobrine

Ahmed Senhadji

Ali Boumendjel
Amina Belouizdad
Hassiba Ben Bouali
Larbi Zekkal
Madani Abbassi
Malek Bennabi
Mohamed Bachir El Ibrahimi
Mohamed Belouizdad
Mohamed Lefkir

Gallery

See also
Cemeteries of Algiers

References

1790 establishments
Cemeteries in Algeria
Buildings and structures in Algiers
18th-century establishments in Africa